Jenkins is an unincorporated community in Morris County, Texas, United States.

History 
Jenkins is off Ellison Creek Reservoir on U.S. Route 259, about 5 miles from Daingerfield, Texas.  As of 1940 (the most recent population estimate), the population is 40.  As of 1984, it had a church and a couple businesses.

Education 
Jenkins is served by the Daingerfield-Lone Star Independent School District.

References

Unincorporated communities in Morris County, Texas
Unincorporated communities in Texas